William J. Swain has served as a diplomat of the Marshall Islands to the United Nations.  He was also the translator of the Book of Mormon into the Marshallese language.

Swain was raised Catholic.  He joined the Church of Jesus Christ of Latter-day Saints (LDS Church) while studying in Arizona. He later served a mission for the LDS Church in Chicago and studied at Brigham Young University–Hawaii.

Swain has also been a candidate for the Marshall Islands National Legislatuire.

Swain is the president of Pa Emman Kabjere, a Marshallese community organization in Hawaii that has been one of the main organizations involved in opposing Hawaii's attempts to cut off healthcare funding for Micronesian immigrants, many of whom suffer cancer and other diseases at least in part caused by United States nuclear testing done in the Marshall Islands.

References

External links
Ram, Rosalind Reyes Meno and Sanoma I. Goodwill, "Netting the Stories of Pioneers from Micronesia" in Grant Underwood, ed., Pioneers in the Pacific: Memory, History and Cultural Identity among the Latter-day Saints. Provo: Brigham Young University, Religious Studies Center, 2005. p. 57-67.
BYU Hawaii alumni association entry on Swain
listing of Global Environment Forum representatives
List of Marshall Islands candidates up for reelection

Converts to Mormonism
Brigham Young University–Hawaii alumni
Marshallese Latter Day Saints
Living people
Marshallese diplomats
Marshallese Mormon missionaries
Translators from English
Translators to Marshallese
Mormon missionaries in the United States
Translators of the Book of Mormon
Year of birth missing (living people)
Missionary linguists